Larrieu is a French surname and may refer to:

 Arnaud Larrieu (b. 1966), French film director and screenwriter
 Francie Larrieu Smith (b. 1952), American track and field athlete
 Jean-Claude Larrieu (b. 1943), French cinematographer
 Jean-Claude Larrieu (b. 1946), French footballer
 Jean-Marie Larrieu (b. 1965), French film director and screenwriter
 Maxence Larrieu (b. 1934), French classical flautist
 Romain Larrieu (b. 1976) French footballer

See also
 Amel Larrieux (b. 1973), American singer-songwriter
 Jorge Larrieux (b. 1946), Uruguayan lawyer and judge